Rescue is a computer game published by Mastertronic in 1987 for the ZX Spectrum.  It was written by Ste Cork with music by Tiny Williams and graphics by Mark O'Neill.

Gameplay

The purpose of the game is to rescue the correct scientist and the "ultimate experiment".  The player must then guide the scientists back to their spacecraft and refuel it before escaping.

The game generates the same maze layout each time it is played, however it randomises which scientist and which secret experiment (represented by a red test tube) is the correct one.

Enemies are spawned randomly and go around destroying the scientists, experiments, fuel and ammo caches, sometimes making it to your spaceship and destroying items you had already recovered.

Reception
In a 1987 review, Your Sinclair described the game as "nice graphics, easy to play but impossible to complete!" and awarded it 7 out of 10.

Rescue was placed at number 44 in the Your Sinclair Official Top 100, compiled by videogame journalist Stuart Campbell in the early 1990s.

References

External links

1987 video games
Action video games
Mastertronic games
Maze games
Science fiction video games
Video games developed in the United Kingdom
ZX Spectrum games
ZX Spectrum-only games